IOL may mean:
 Iol, an ancient city in Algeria, now Cherchell
 Independent Online (South Africa),  news website
 Institute of Linguists, UK, now Chartered Institute of Linguists
 International Linguistics Olympiad, an International Science Olympiad
 Intraocular lens, eye implant
 Ireland On-Line, a former internet service provider (ISP) in Ireland
 The University of New Hampshire InterOperability Laboratory (UNH-IOL), for networking testing
 Induction of labor, the process or treatment that stimulates childbirth

See also
 IOI (disambiguation)
 LOL (disambiguation)